"She Doesn't Dance" is a song co-written and recorded by American country music artist Mark McGuinn.  It was released in December 2001 as the third single from the album Mark McGuinn.  The song reached #29 on the Billboard Hot Country Singles & Tracks chart.  The song was written by McGuinn, Don Pfrimmer and Shane Decker.

Chart performance

References

Songs about dancing
2001 singles
2001 songs
Mark McGuinn songs
Songs written by Don Pfrimmer
Songs written by Mark McGuinn